Enkurin is a protein that in humans is encoded by the ENKUR gene.

Enkurin interacts with transient receptor potential canonical (TRPC) cation channels (e.g., TRPC1) and functions as an adaptor protein, tethering signal transduction proteins to TRPC channels.

References

Further reading